Mensahe TV (lit. Message TV) is an  Islam-focused television channel in the Philippines. It is run by the Mercy Islamic Foundation and has been aired on Cignal cable, Channel 184, and Sky Cable; with its studios and offices based in Davao City. It also provides content via mobile applications, social media, and on their website.

As of 2018, Mensahe TV has ceased airing on Cignal cable, but can still be viewed via  social media and on-air thru PTV Channel 4.

History
Mensahe TV first entered media broadcast thru AM radio. Mensahe TV worked with RPN and Radio Ukay Davao on a series of radio programs in 2016.

In 2017, Mensahe TV merged with Mercy Online Islamic Channel and took directors Brandon Gorospe and Ralph Jasper Jose of Studio One Productions for a new scheme of operations; this merger made Mensahe TV as the new International standard for Suni  Islam. Mensahe TV then set up a division, this is to incorporate films as Mensahe TV and recorded content (tasjil) for Mercy Islamic Foundation. Salipada Datumanong as managing director funded the renovation of the new studio at Davao city giving way to new programs such as Tara! Sabay Tayo and Aqeedah.

Actors
 Andrade, Abdullah (Salvador Andrade Jr.)
 Abdullah, Bedejim
 Barcelon, Akhmad
 Cacharo, Ismael
 Caderao, Abdulrahman
 Capariño, Nuh
 Datumanong, Ebraheem
 Datumanong, Salipada
 Español, Ismael
 Gamboa, Joonie
 Gorospe, Brandon
 Javier, Akhmad
 Javier, Shaheed
 Jose, Ralph Jasper
 Luspo. Ada Grace
 Macacoa, Jamil (Imam)
 Masbod, Amor
 Menk, Ismael (Mufti)
 Navarra, Mujahid
 Patriarca, Hudhayfa
 Santillan, Abdulkareem
 Villasencio, Gibson

Film
 Islam in the Philippines (2016)
 The Call of our Forefathers (2016)
 Hiwar - an Open Dialogue (2017)
 Gabay (2018)
 Building Bridges (2018)
 Building Bridges (2019)
 Bukal (2020)

References

External links
 Mensahe TV's YouTube account

2017 establishments in the Philippines
Television channels and stations established in 2015
Islamic television networks